Gapyeong Cycling Team is a South Korean UCI Continental cycling team established in 2017.

Team roster

References

External links

UCI Continental Teams (Asia)
Cycling teams established in 2017
Cycling teams based in South Korea
2017 establishments in South Korea